The Cartagena Film Festival, or FICCI, is a film festival held in Cartagena, Colombia, which focuses mainly on the promotion of Colombian television series, Latin American films and short films. The Cartagena Film Festival, which is held every March, is the oldest film festival in Latin America.

The Cartagena Film Festival was founded 1959 by Victor Nieto. Nieto remained the director of the film festival for 48 years, his last being in 2008. Nieto died at the age of 92 in November 2008. Lina Paola Rodriguez was appointed manager by Nieto in 2007 and 2008, and will remain acting director following Nieto's death.

Best Film winners

See also

 Latin American television awards

References

External links
  Cartagena Film Festival official website
Cartagena Film Festival  at the Internet Movie Database

Recurring events established in 1960
Colombian film awards
Colombian television awards
Film festivals in Colombia
Tourist attractions in Cartagena, Colombia
Film festivals established in 1960